Wiesbach is a river of Hesse, Germany.

It is a right tributary of the Weil before , a district of Weilmünster.

See also
List of rivers of Hesse

References

Rivers of Hesse
Rivers of Germany